Cartierville is a former district in north end Montreal, Quebec, Canada, located in the borough of Ahuntsic-Cartierville.

Cartierville is bordered to the north by the Rivière des Prairies, to the south by the borough of Saint-Laurent, to the east across Autoroute 15 by Ahuntsic, and to the west by Bois-de-Saraguay Nature Park.

History

Cartierville grew as a suburb when it became in 1898 the north terminus of the Montreal Park and Island Railway tramway line, also known as the "17-Cartierville". Named in the honour of Sir George-Étienne Cartier, it became a village officially in 1906. During December 1912, it achieved city status. Two years later, the rural and agricultural part of Cartierville was granted independence from the city and was then known as Ville de Saraguay.

On 22 December 1916, the provincial government ordered the annexation of Cartierville to Montreal. Cartierville was famous for the Belmont Park amusement park which operated from 1929 to the 1980s.

Prior to the 2002 merger with the district (quartier) of Ahuntsic, Cartierville was composed of three neighborhoods: Cartierville, Bordeaux and Nouveau-Bordeaux.

Education
The Commission scolaire de Montréal operates French-language public schools in Ahuntsic-Cartierville. Four French elementary schools serve the neighborhood: Beau-Séjour, Louisbourg, Saint-Odile and Alice-Parizeau

The English Montreal School Board (EMSB) operates English-language schools.

The Montreal Public Libraries Network operates the Cartierville library.

References

External links
 Site web de la Ville de Montréal 

Neighbourhoods in Montreal
Ahuntsic-Cartierville